Ytre Rendal is a former municipality in the old Hedmark county, Norway. The  municipality existed from 1880 until its dissolution in 1965 when it was merged with the neighboring municipality of Øvre Rendal to form the new Rendalen Municipality. The administrative centre was the village of Otnes where Ytre Rendal Church is located.

History
On 1 January 1838, the large municipality of Rendal was established. This municipality spanned  from the Østerdalen valley to the border with Sweden. During the 1870s, discussions began on dividing the large municipality. On 1 January 1880, the municipality of Rendal was split in two to create the municipalities of Ytre Rendal (population: 1,661) and Øvre Rendal (population: 1,868). On 1 January 1911, the new municipality of Engerdal was established to the east of Ytre Rendal. This new municipality was created by taking  of eastern Ytre Rendal, plus area from the neighboring municipalities of Øvre Rendal, Tolga, and Trysil. This portion of Ytre Rendal that became part of Engerdal had 311 residents. During the 1960s, there were many municipal mergers across Norway due to the work of the Schei Committee. On 1 January 1965, the new municipality of Rendalen was created by merging Ytre Rendal (population: 1,913) and Øvre Rendal (population: 1,629).

Government

The municipal council  of Ytre Rendal was made up of representatives that were elected to four year terms.  The party breakdown of the final municipal council was as follows:

See also
List of former municipalities of Norway
List of notable residents of Ytre Rendal

References

Rendalen
Former municipalities of Norway
1880 establishments in Norway
1965 disestablishments in Norway